Letot was a French sailor who represented his country at the 1900 Summer Olympics in Meulan, France. Letot, as helmsman, took the 10th place in first race of the 0.5 to 1 ton and finished 7th in the second race. He did this with the boat Galopin.

Further reading

References

External links

French male sailors (sport)
Sailors at the 1900 Summer Olympics – .5 to 1 ton
Olympic sailors of France
Year of death missing
Year of birth missing
Sailors at the 1900 Summer Olympics – Open class
Place of birth missing
Place of death missing
Missing middle or first names